Frank Magri (born 4 September 1999) is a French professional footballer who plays as a forward for Ligue 2 club Bastia.

Career
A youth product of Angers since the age of 15, Magri began his senior career with their reserves in 2019. He signed his first professional contract with the club on 16 August 2021. He transferred to the Ligue 2 side Bastia on 7 January 2022. He made his senior and professional debut with Bastia in a 1–1 (5–4) penalty shootout win over Reims on 29 January 2022, scoring his side's 4th penalty.

Personal life
Born in France, Magri is of Cameroonian descent.

References

External links
 

1999 births
Living people
Sportspeople from Agen
French sportspeople of Cameroonian descent
French footballers
Footballers from Nouvelle-Aquitaine
Association football forwards
Ligue 2 players
Championnat National 2 players
Championnat National 3 players
SC Bastia players